The 2014–15 Swiss Super League was the 118th season of top-tier football in Switzerland. It began on 19 July 2014 and ended on 29 May 2015. Basel successfully defended their title for a record sixth time in a row.

A total of 10 teams competed in the league, the 9 best teams from the 2013–14 season and the 2013–14 Swiss Challenge League champion FC Vaduz.

Teams

Stadia and locations

Personnel and kits

League table

Results

First and Second Round

Third and Fourth Round

Season statistics

Top scorers

Awards

Annual awards

References

External links
 
 
Swiss Super League at uefa.com

Swiss Super League
1
Swiss Super League seasons